The Mozart Story is a 1948 Austrian-American film. It is a re-edited version of Whom the Gods Love (1942).

Cast
Hans Holt as Wolfgang Amadeus Mozart
William Vedder as Joseph Haydn
René Daltgen as Ludwig van Beethoven
Wilton Graff as Antonio Salieri
Winnie Markus as Constance Weber Mozart
Irene von Meyendorf as Louisa Weber
Walther Janssen as Leopold
Annie Rosar as Madame Weber
Carol Forman as Catherine Cavalleria
Tony Barr as Ruffini
Paul Hoerbiger as Strack
Thea Weiss as Sophia Weber

References

External links

The Mozart Story at BFI
Review of film at New York Times

1948 films
Austrian biographical films
American biographical films
Austrian black-and-white films
Films about Wolfgang Amadeus Mozart
Alternative versions of films
1940s English-language films
1940s American films